John's Cove may refer to:

John's Cove (New Jersey)
Johns Cove, Nova Scotia